Munks is a surname. Notable people with the surname include:

 David Munks (born 1947), English footballer
 Sheryl Munks (born 1965), Australian actress
Jeffrey Munks (born 1995), South African Musician, Composer & Author

See also
 Chipmunks, small, striped squirrels found in North America
 Golders Green Beth Hamedrash, an Ashkenazi Orthodox Jewish congregation located in Golders Green, London, England
 Munk, a surname